Her Choice is an American silent film. It has been cited as the first film of actress Anita Stewart.

Cast
Zena Keefe as Edith, the Poor Niece
Anna M. Stewart as May, the Vain Niece
Julia Swayne Gordon as Mrs. Leticia Summers, the Aunt
Mary Maurice as May's Mother
Rose Tapley as Edith's Mother

Production
At the time she appeared in this film, Anita Stewart was making $25.00 a week as an extra at Vitagraph.

Release
Her Choice was released in the United States on September 30, 1912, and was still in circulation on both coasts in early November.

Preservation
A 16mm print of Her Choice has been preserved by the Museum of Modern Art.

References

External links
 

1912 films
1912 comedy-drama films
1910s English-language films
American black-and-white films
American silent short films
Films directed by Ralph Ince
1910s American films
Comedy-drama short films
Silent American comedy-drama films